The Albert Medal for Lifesaving was a British medal awarded to recognize the saving of life. It has since been replaced by the George Cross.

The Albert Medal was first instituted by a royal warrant on 7 March 1866. It was named in memory of Prince Albert and originally was awarded to recognize saving life at sea. The original medal had a blue ribbon " (16 mm) wide with two white stripes. A further royal warrant in 1867 created two classes of Albert Medal, the first in gold and bronze and the second in bronze, both enamelled in blue, and the ribbon of the first class changed to 1 " (35 mm) wide with four white stripes. The medal was made of gold (although early examples are gold and bronze), which was enameled blue.  There were miniatures of all four types (two classes each for sea and land, with the gold awards believed to be gilt.

The first recipient of the medal was Samuel Popplestone, a tenant farmer, who on 23 March 1866 helped to rescue four men after the cargo ship Spirit of the Ocean lost its battle with force eleven gales and was torn apart as it was swept onto the notorious Start Point rocks in Devon. Witnessing the accident, Popplestone paused only to raise the alarm before setting off alone for the wreck, armed with just a small coil of rope. He clambered out onto the rocks and although swept off several times, he eventually managed to lift four men out of the water and drag them up the cliff to safety. As the story of Popplestone's bravery became known through the press, he was hailed as a hero and as a result of his heroism he became the first recipient of the brand new award for civilian gallantry.

In 1877, the medal was extended to cover saving life on land and from this point there are two medals with different inscriptions to depict which they were awarded for.  The land version was enamelled in red, with a red ribbon.  The titles of the medals changed in 1917, the gold "Albert Medal, first class" becoming the "Albert Medal in gold" and the bronze "Albert Medal, second class" being known as just the "Albert Medal".

The event that led to the introduction of the Albert Medal for Gallantry on Land was the Tynewydd Colliery disaster which occurred on 11 April 1877. In many ways, although it was tragic the disaster at Tynewydd was, by the standards of the time when single mining accidents often claimed hundreds of lives, relatively unremarkable. However, as the enthralling saga of the determined, dangerous and stoic rescue of the surviving colliers was dramatically and episodically reported in the press it captured the imagination of the public and MPs. Consequently, released from Windsor Castle on 25 April 1877, it was announced that "the Albert Medal, hitherto only bestowed for gallantry in saving life at sea, shall be extended for similar actions on land, and that the first medals struck for this purpose shall be conferred on the heroic rescuers of the Welsh miners".

Aya-I-Ga, Neighbour or Nipper (c.1882 – 21 June 1954) was a police tracker and stockman in the Northern Territory of Australia. He is the first Indigenous Australian to win a medal for gallantry, for saving a policeman from drowning in 1911.

The Albert Medal in gold was abolished in 1949, being replaced by the George Cross, and the second class of Albert Medal (in bronze) was only awarded posthumously. In 1971, the Albert Medal was discontinued (along with the Edward Medal) and all living recipients were invited to exchange the award for the George Cross. From the total of 64 eligible to exchange, 49 took up the option.

The last two awards were promulgated in the London Gazette of 31 March 1970, to the late First Officer Geoffrey Clifford Bye of Boolaroo, New South Wales, Australia, and on 11 August 1970 to the late Kenneth Owen McIntyre of Fairy Meadow, New South Wales, Australia.

Awards made

References

External links
Albert Medal and Edward Medal
George Cross and Albert Medal at Sea in World War 2

Civil awards and decorations of the United Kingdom
 
Courage awards
Awards disestablished in 1971
1971 disestablishments in the United Kingdom
Awards established in 1866
1866 establishments in the United Kingdom
Lifesaving